The 1933 Montana Grizzlies football team represented the University of Montana in the 1933 college football season as a member of the Pacific Coast Conference (PCC). The Grizzlies were led by third-year head coach Bunny Oakes, played their home games at Dornblaser Field and finished the season with a record of three wins and four losses (3–4, 0–4 PCC).

Schedule

References

Montana
Montana Grizzlies football seasons
Montana Grizzlies football